Upfront is the eighth solo album of John Miles, released in 1993. It was his first album in eight years, due to being involved in several other projects, such as an album with Jimmy Page, an album with Joe Cocker, singing several tracks on albums by the Alan Parsons Project and touring with Tina Turner.

It was also the first CD where bassist Bob Marshall did not play or co-write songs with Miles.

Track listing
All tracks written by John Miles
"Everything's Ok"
"Can't Get Through"
"One More Day Without Love"
"Oh How the Years Go By"
"What Goes Around"
"Now That the Magic Has Gone"
"It's Such a Mystery"
"Body of My Brunette"
"For Ever and Ever"
"It's Not Over Yet"
"Chains and Wild Horses"
"Absent Hearts"
"Pale Spanish Moon"

Personnel
John Miles - lead vocals, guitar
Ollie Marland - keyboards
Jack Bruno - drums
Neil Stubenhaus - bass

References

1993 albums
John Miles (musician) albums
Albums produced by Chris Lord-Alge
EMI Records albums